The 1981 Southland Conference men's basketball tournament was held March 3–5 at a combination of on-campus gymnasiums and the Beaumont Civic Center in Beaumont, Texas. This was the first edition of the tournament.

 defeated  in the championship game, 83–69, to win their first Southland men's basketball tournament.

The Cardinals, in turn, received a bid to the 1981 NCAA Tournament. They were the only Southland member invited to the tournament.

Format
All six of the conference's members participated in the tournament field. They were seeded based on regular season conference records, with the top two teams earning byes into the semifinal round. The other four teams entered into the preliminary first round. A third-place game was held on the last day.

First Round games were played at the home court of the higher-seeded team. All remaining games were played at the Beaumont Civic Center in Beaumont, Texas, the home court of regular season champion Lamar.

Bracket

References

Southland Conference men's basketball tournament
Tournament
Southland Conference men's basketball tournament
Southland Conference men's basketball tournament
Basketball competitions in Texas
Sports in Beaumont, Texas